Jonathan Crombie (October 12, 1966 – April 15, 2015) was a Canadian actor and voice over artist, best known for playing Gilbert Blythe in CBC Television's 1985 telefilm Anne of Green Gables and its two sequels.

Early life
Crombie was born on October 12, 1966 in Toronto, Ontario, the son of David Crombie, who was the mayor of Toronto from 1972 to 1978 and a Canadian federal Cabinet Minister in the 1980s. Crombie attended Lawrence Park Collegiate Institute, where he was spotted by casting agent Diane Polley performing in a production of The Wizard of Oz.

Career

Television
Crombie had no previous acting experience and used a photo he took at a kiosk in Union Station when he auditioned for the role of Gilbert Blythe in the 1985 TV miniseries Anne of Green Gables. He reprised the role in the 1987 TV movie Anne of Avonlea, the 2000 TV movie Anne of Green Gables: The Continuing Story and an episode of Road to Avonlea in 1992. His role was so popular that he answered to the nickname "Gil".

Crombie was also a comedian and in 1998 performed on the Canadian TV series Comedy Now! as part of a sketch comedy group. His other television credits included a guest appearance on an episode of the Vancouver-filmed TV series 21 Jump Street in 1991, voicing the title character in the animated series The Secret World of Benjamin Bear (2003–2009), along with its 3 prequel films, and appearing in the second season of Slings & Arrows (2005), as playwright Lionel Train. In 2015, he had a guest role on The Good Wife and Haven.

In 2014, Crombie and John Mitchell wrote, produced, and directed a documentary titled Waiting for Ishtar about the 1987 film Ishtar. The documentary was financed by an Indiegogo crowdfunding campaign. It premiered at Cinecycle in Toronto on December 14, 2017.  It was dedicated to the memory of Jonathan Crombie.

Theatre
Crombie appeared on stage in The Dishwashers by Morris Panych (Tarragon Theatre, 2005) and The Oxford Roof Climbers Rebellion by Stephen Massicotte (Tarragon Theatre/Great Canadian Stage Company, 2006). He spent four seasons at Ontario's Stratford Shakespeare Festival appearing in A Comedy Of Errors, Hamlet, As You Like It, Taming Of The Shrew, and as Romeo in Diana Leblanc's Romeo and Juliet. He was nominated for a Dora Mavor Moore Award for his role in the Canadian Stage Company's 1997 production of Tom Stoppard's play Arcadia.

Crombie debuted on Broadway in the Canadian musical The Drowsy Chaperone as "Man in Chair", from March to April 2007. He returned to the production beginning August 21, and performed the role during the show's tour through the United States.

In 2013, Crombie performed at Centerstage, Baltimore, in Clybourne Park and Benetha's Place for the Rasin Cycle featured on PBS. His final appearance on stage was playing two roles in the Denver Center for the Performing Arts Theatre Company's 2015 world premiere of Benediction, based on the novel by Kent Haruf.

Death
Crombie's family announced on April 18, 2015 that he had died suddenly three days earlier of a brain hemorrhage in New York City. His organs were donated. News of his death led to "Gilbert Blythe" trending on Twitter as fans shared their condolences.

Personal life 
Crombie never married and had no children. At his memorial service in 2015, livetweeted by TVOntario journalist Steve Paikin, his sister Robin said that "Jonathan was also a gay man who didn’t come out until his 40s ... He was a very private person."

Filmography

References

External links

Jonathan Crombie as Gilbert Blythe

1966 births
2015 deaths
Canadian male stage actors
Male actors from Toronto
Canadian male television actors
Canadian male voice actors
20th-century Canadian male actors
21st-century Canadian male actors
Canadian gay actors
21st-century Canadian LGBT people
20th-century Canadian LGBT people